Heliotropium anderssonii is a species of plant in the family Boraginaceae. It is endemic to Ecuador.

References

anderssonii
Endemic flora of Ecuador
Vulnerable plants
Taxonomy articles created by Polbot